Pettifogger may refer to:
 Larsen E. Pettifogger, a character in the comic strip The Wizard of Id
 The Pettifogger, a 2011 film from Lewis Klahr

See also
 Gaming the system
 Trivial objections